Manolis Bolakis (born 20 October 1994) is a Greek professional footballer who plays as a right-back for Gamma Ethniki club Atsalenios.

Honours
OFI
Football League: 2017–18

References

1994 births
Living people
Greece under-21 international footballers
Greece youth international footballers
Super League Greece players
Football League (Greece) players
OFI Crete F.C. players
Association football defenders
Footballers from Heraklion
Greek footballers